Admiral Sir Peircy Brett (1709 – 14 October 1781) was a Royal Navy officer. As a junior officer he served on George Anson's voyage around the world and commanded the landing party which sacked and burned the town of Paita in November 1741. During the Jacobite rising Brett saw action on 9 July 1745, when as captain of the fourth-rate  he exchanged fire with the French ships Elizabeth and the Du Teillay: the Du Teillay at the time was carrying Charles Edward Stuart to Scotland with supplies and funds to support his cause. Brett also commanded the third-rate  at the First Battle of Cape Finisterre in May 1747 during the War of the Austrian Succession. He commanded  on the North America and West Indies Station during the Seven Years' War and later became Senior Naval Lord. He was also a Member of Parliament, representing the constituency of Queenborough from 1754 until 1774.

Naval career

Early career
Born the son of Peircy Brett, a master in the navy, Brett joined the Royal Navy as a volunteer in around 1725. Promoted to lieutenant on 6 December 1734, he was appointed to the fourth-rate .

In February 1741 Brett transferred to Anson's own ship, the fourth-rate , as second lieutenant, and in this capacity, he commanded the landing party which sacked and burned the town of Paita in November 1741. After the capture of the Spanish treasure ship "Nuestra Señora de Covadonga", Brett became first lieutenant.

On 30 September 1743, Anson made him captain of the Centurion when Anson himself had to leave the ship for a time in Canton. Once the party returned to England, on the arrival of the Centurion at Spithead on 15 June 1744 the Admiralty refused to confirm Brett's promotion to post-captain, although they did give Brett a new commission as post-captain dated the day the ship anchored. However, on 29 December 1744 the original commission date (30 September 1743) was confirmed under a new Admiralty Board of which Anson was a member.

During the Jacobite rising Brett saw action on 9 July 1745, when as captain of the fourth-rate  he exchanged fire with the French ships Elizabeth and the Du Teillay. The Du Teillay at the time was carrying Charles Edward Stuart to Scotland with supplies and funds to support his cause. The Lion suffered severe damage and had to give up the pursuit and Charles eventually landed at Eriskay. He transferred to the command of the third-rate  in 1747 and commanded her at the First Battle of Cape Finisterre in May 1747 during the War of the Austrian Succession.

In 1748, Anson's official version of his voyage round the World was published. As well as detailing the expedition, it contained a large amount of useful information for future navigators and with forty-two detailed charts and engravings most based on drawings by Brett. In 1752 Brett commanded the Royal Yacht Royal Caroline for a voyage conveying King George II to Germany, for which he was awarded a knighthood. He was appointed captain responsible for all Royal yachts in 1754, and elected as MP for Queensborough in the same year.

A new 80-gun ship of the line, was commissioned in January 1756. Brett was named as her first captain, bringing with him his choice of petty officers and foretopmen from the Royal yacht fleet. Despite her commissioning Cambridge required several months of fitting out for sea service and was still unseaworthy when war with France was declared in May 1756. Brett was forced to wait until December for Cambridge to be declared fit to put to sea, and then it was not until February 1757 that she was equipped with her full complement of cannon.

Brett's orders were to join Admiral Edward Boscawen's Western Squadron protecting British interests on the North America and West Indies Station. Having finally put to sea he found that his ship was slow and top-heavy, with a tendency to heel over in strong winds. He was also forced to deal with widespread sickness among his crew. Disease spread so fast among the crew that Cambridge was forced to return to Plymouth after only one year at sea so that the sick could be discharged to local hospitals. On 5 November 1758 Brett was granted a new position as flag captain for Admiral Anson aboard the 100-gun . He resigned this commission ten days later and returned to his previous role as captain of the Royal yachts.

Flag officer
Brett was promoted to rear admiral in 1762. When peace was declared in 1764 Brett returned to service aboard Anson's old vessel Centurion, and was stationed in the Mediterranean. He was appointed to the Board of Admiralty as Senior Naval Lord in the Chatham ministry under Sir Edward Hawke in December 1766, holding office until 28 February 1770. He was promoted to vice admiral on 18 October 1770 and, having resigned his constituency of Queensborough in 1774, he was promoted to full admiral on 29 January 1778. He lived at the Clock House in Beckenham in Kent; he died on 14 October 1781 and was buried at St George's Church, Beckenham.

Family
Brett married Henrietta Colby; the couple had two sons, who died in infancy, and a daughter.

References

Sources

J. K. Laughton, Brett, Sir Peircy (1709–1781), rev. Roger Morriss, Oxford Dictionary of National Biography, Oxford University Press, 2004 
 
 

|-

1709 births
1781 deaths
Lords of the Admiralty
Royal Navy admirals
British MPs 1754–1761
British MPs 1761–1768
British MPs 1768–1774
Members of the Parliament of Great Britain for English constituencies